Just Us may refer to:

Music
 Just Us, a 1970s British band led by Elton Dean
 Just Us (duo), an American pop music duo
 Just Us (Alabama album), 1987
 Just Us (JYJ album), 2014
 Just Us (Faust album), 2014
 Just Us (Roy Haynes album), 1960
 "Just Us" (song), by DJ Khaled, 2019

Other uses
 Just Us, Atlanta, a neighborhood of Atlanta, Georgia, U.S.
 Just Us!, a Canadian importer of fair trade coffee, tea, sugar, and chocolate
 Just Us (film), a 1986 Australian film
 Just Us: An American Conversation, a 2020 anthology by Claudia Rankine